Capparis arborea is a bush or small tree occurring in eastern Australia. The habitat is rainforest; usually riverine, littoral or the drier rainforests. Distributed from the Hunter River, New South Wales to Cape Melville in tropical Queensland. Common names include native pomegranate, wild lime, wild lemon and brush caper berry.

Description 
Up to 8 metres tall with a stem diameter of 25 cm, but usually seen much smaller. The trunk is crooked, short and irregular in appearance. Many sharp prickles grow on younger plants. Grey bark, with less sharp spines in older trees. Small branches fairly thick, dark grey though more green at the end.

Leaves alternate on the stem, simple, oblong-lanceolate in shape. Sometimes ovate oblong in shape. 5 to 10 cm long, 1.5 to 5 cm wide. Mostly rounded at the tip, although some leaves pointed at the tip. Juvenile leaves smaller than adult leaves with a prickly pointed leaf tip. Leaf veins visible on both surfaces. The midrib is raised under the leaf, but sunken on the top of the leaf.

Flowers and fruit 
Single white flowers form from the leaf axils, around 4 cm in diameter. The attractive open wiry flowers form from January to March. Petals 15 mm long, fringed at the edges. The thin flower stalks are 30 to 50 mm long.

From December to March, a fruit resembling a guava forms. Green, smooth and soft, globular in shape. Around 2.5 to 6 cm in diameter. Fruit stalks 3 to 5 cm long. The seeds are round and flattened, 8 to 10 mm in diameter. The ripe fruit are yellow, with the pulp surrounding the seeds being edible, and were a source of food for Aboriginal people. Germination from  fresh seed is not particularly difficult, with the first seeds germinating after three weeks.

References

 Hiddins, L., Bush Tucker Field Guide, Explore Australia Publishing 2003,  p. 95
 
 
 Queensland Museum, Wild Plants of Greater Brisbane, Queensland Museum 2003,  p. 251

arborea
Flora of Queensland
Flora of New South Wales
Trees of Australia
Taxa named by Ferdinand von Mueller